Juan Carlos Ferrero was the defending champion but lost in the semifinals to Fernando Verdasco.

Verdasco won in the final 7–6(7–5), 6–3 against Albert Montañés.

Seeds
A champion seed is indicated in bold text while text in italics indicates the round in which that seed was eliminated.

  Juan Carlos Ferrero (semifinals)
  Feliciano López (second round)
  Ivan Ljubičić (second round)
  Albert Costa (second round)
  David Sánchez (first round)
  Alberto Martín (semifinals)
  David Ferrer (quarterfinals)
  Rubén Ramírez Hidalgo (second round)

Draw

External links
 Singles draw
 Qualifying draw

Singles